Statistics of Bulgarian State Football Championship in the 1943 season.

Overview
It was contested by 26 teams, and PFC Slavia Sofia won the championship. Besides teams from the present borders of Bulgaria, the 1943 season also involved teams from the areas under Bulgarian administration during much of World War II. Football clubs from Bitola and Skopje in Vardar Macedonia and Kavala in Greek Macedonia took part in the competition.

Teams
The teams that participated in the competition were the winners of their local sport districts. According to the format of the competition - Sofia is having five seeds and Varna and Plovdiv two seeds each. Note that Makedonia Skopie was competing in the Sofia sport district during that season of the championship.

First round

|}

Second round

|}

Quarter-finals

|}

Semi-finals

|}

Final

First game

Second game

Slavia Sofia won 2–0 on aggregate.

References
Bulgaria - List of final tables (RSSSF)

Bulgarian State Football Championship seasons
1
1